Salinimicrobium gaetbulicola is a Gram-negative and aerobic bacterium from the genus of Salinimicrobium which has been isolated from tidal flat sediments from the coast of Korea.

References

Flavobacteria
Bacteria described in 2012